Euphalacra discipuncta is a moth in the family Drepanidae. It was described by Jeremy Daniel Holloway in 1976. It is found on Borneo. The habitat consists of lowland to lower montane forests.

References

Moths described in 1976
Drepaninae